Mark Watson (born 28 December 1973) is an English former footballer who played as a forward.

Watson signed for West Ham United in 1995 for £50,000, following a 16-goal season for Sutton United in 1994–95. He travelled with the West Ham team on their 1995 Centenary Tour of Australia, playing in three of the four games and scoring on his debut. He spend almost the whole of the 1995–96 season playing for the reserve team, where he scored 15 goals in 24 Combination matches as well as 3 goals in 8 matches in the Capital League. He was loaned to Leyton Orient in September 1995, Cambridge United in October 1995, and Shrewsbury Town in February 1996. He didn't make his competitive debut for West Ham until 27 April 1996, the penultimate game of the season, when he was a 77th-minute substitute against Queens Park Rangers. This proved to be his only appearance for West Ham before making a permanent switch to AFC Bournemouth, on 17 May 1996, in a deal that saw Steve Jones move in the opposite direction.

References

Since 1888... The Searchable Premiership and Football League Player Database (subscription required)

1973 births
Living people
English footballers
Association football forwards
Premier League players
Sutton United F.C. players
West Ham United F.C. players
Leyton Orient F.C. players
Cambridge United F.C. players
Shrewsbury Town F.C. players
AFC Bournemouth players
Welling United F.C. players
Woking F.C. players
Chesham United F.C. players
Aldershot Town F.C. players
English Football League players